PS Earl Spencer was a paddle steamer passenger vessel operated by the London and North Western Railway from 1874 to 1896.

Description
She was powered by a two-cylinder oscillating steam engine, which had cylinders of  diameter by  stroke.

History
Earl Spencer was built in 1874 as yard number 416 by Laird Brothers, Birkenhead, Cheshire for the London and North Western Railway. She was launched on 4 July. Her port of registry was London and the United Kingdom Official Number 70620 was allocated. On 17 October 1874, she collided with the schooner Merlin in the Irish Sea whilst on a voyage from Greenore, County Louth to Holyhead, Anglesey. Merlin sank. Her three crew were rescued by Earl Spencer and landed at Holyhead. In 1885, her port of registry was changed to Dublin. On 7 January 1888, she became stranded on the breakwater at Holyhead. Her 57 passengers were rescued, 50 by rocket apparatus and the rest by the Holyhead lifeboat. She was scrapped at Preston, Lancashire in the second quarter of 1896.

Citations

1874 ships
Passenger ships of the United Kingdom
Steamships
Ships built on the River Mersey
Ships of the London and North Western Railway
Paddle steamers of the United Kingdom
Maritime incidents in October 1874
Maritime incidents in January 1888